Patrick Schönfeld (born 21 June 1989) is a German professional footballer who plays as a midfielder.

Career
Schönfeld was born in Nuremberg. In 2015, he joined Eintracht Braunschweig from FC Erzgebirge Aue on a free transfer. Previously, he had played professionally for Rot-Weiß Oberhausen and Arminia Bielefeld.

Career statistics

References

External links
 
 

1989 births
Living people
Footballers from Nuremberg
German footballers
Association football forwards
2. Bundesliga players
3. Liga players
1. FC Nürnberg players
Rot-Weiß Oberhausen players
Arminia Bielefeld players
FC Erzgebirge Aue players
Eintracht Braunschweig players
SV Wehen Wiesbaden players